Acrida is a genus of grasshoppers in the family Acrididae. The genus contains around 40 species which are found in Africa, Europe, Asia, North America, Hawaii, and Australia. Insects of this genus are omnivorous and a well-known pest of many agricultural crops.

Species
, the Orthoptera Species File accepted the following species:

Gallery

References

External links
 AcridAfrica (in French)

 
Acrididae genera
Orthoptera of Asia
Orthoptera of Indo-China
Taxa named by Carl Linnaeus